Donteea Dye Jr. (born August 20, 1993) is an American football wide receiver who is a free agent. He played college football at Heidelberg University.

Professional career
Even though Dye impressed scouts at the NFL Scouting Combine by running a 4.39 40-yard dash, he went undrafted in the 2015 NFL Draft.

Tampa Bay Buccaneers 
He signed as an undrafted rookie on May 11, 2015 by the Tampa Bay Buccaneers.

Dye caught his first pass, a touchdown thrown by Jameis Winston, in a 31-30 loss in Week 6, 2015, to the Washington Redskins. On December 17, playing against the St. Louis Rams, Dye caught a 44-yard reception inside the 5-yard line and began to celebrate, even though the play was still live. As a result, he fumbled the ball.

On August 30, 2016, Dye was waived by the Buccaneers with an injury settlement. He was re-signed to the practice squad on October 17, 2016. Two days later, Dye was promoted to the Buccaneers active roster. On October 22, the Buccaneers released Dye and re-signed him to the practice squad on October 25. He was promoted back to the active roster on December 10, 2016. He was placed on injured reserve on December 21, 2016.

On September 2, 2017, Dye was waived by the Buccaneers.

Tampa Bay Buccaneers (second stint) 
On August 26, 2018, Dye re-signed with the Buccaneers. He was waived on September 1, 2018.

Orlando Apollos 
On September 14, 2018, Dye signed with the Orlando Apollos of the Alliance of American Football. The league ceased operations in April 2019.

Los Angeles Wildcats 
On October 15, 2019, Dye was drafted in the 10th round during phase one in the 2020 XFL Draft by the Los Angeles Wildcats. He was waived during mini-camp

Tampa Bay Vipers 
Dye signed with the Tampa Bay Vipers on December 22, 2019. He was waived again on February 25, 2020.

St. Louis BattleHawks 
On November 17, 2022, Dye was drafted by the St. Louis BattleHawks of the XFL.

References

External links
Tampa Bay Buccaneers bio

1993 births
Living people
American football wide receivers
Heidelberg Student Princes football players
Los Angeles Wildcats (XFL) players
Orlando Apollos players
People from Fairfield, Ohio
Players of American football from Ohio
Sportspeople from the Cincinnati metropolitan area
Tampa Bay Buccaneers players
Tampa Bay Vipers players
St. Louis BattleHawks players